A frigorific mixture is a mixture of two or more phases in a chemical system that, so long as none of the phases are completely consumed during equilibration, reaches an equilibrium temperature that is independent of the starting temperature of the phases before they are mixed.  The equilibrium temperature is also independent of the quantities of the phases used as long as sufficient amounts of each are present to reach equilibrium without consuming one or more.

Ice
Liquid water and ice, for example, form a frigorific mixture at 0 °C or 32 °F.  This mixture was once used to define 0 °C. That temperature is now defined as the triple point of Water with well-defined isotope ratios. A mixture of ammonium chloride, water, and ice form a frigorific mixture at about −17.8 °C or 0 °F. This mixture was once used to define 0 °F.

Explanation
The existence of frigorific mixtures can be viewed as a consequence of the Gibbs phase rule, which describes the relationship at equilibrium between the number of components, the number of coexisting phases, and the number of degrees of freedom permitted by the conditions of heterogeneous equilibrium.  Specifically, at constant atmospheric pressure, in a system containing  linearly independent chemical components, if +1 phases are specified to be present in equilibrium, then the system is fully determined (there are no degrees of freedom). That is, the temperature and the compositions of all phases are determined. Thus, in for example the chemical system H2O-NaCl, which has two components, the simultaneous presence of the three phases liquid, ice, and hydrohalite can exist only at atmospheric pressure at the unique temperature of –21.2 °C
. The approach to equilibrium of a frigorific mixture involves spontaneous temperature change driven by the conversion of latent heat into sensible heat as the phase proportions adjust to accommodate the decrease in thermodynamic potential associated with the approach to equilibrium.

Other examples
Other examples of frigorific mixtures include:

Uses
A frigorific mixture may be used to obtain a liquid medium that has a reproducible temperature below ambient temperature. Such mixtures were used to calibrate thermometers. In chemistry a cooling bath may be used to control the temperature of a strongly exothermic reaction. 

A frigorific mixture may be used as an alternative to mechanical refrigeration. For example to fit two machined metal parts together, one part is placed in a frigorific mixture, causing it to contract so that may be easily inserted into the uncooled second part; on warming the two parts are held together tightly.

Limitations of acid base slushes

Mixtures relying on the use of acid base slushes are of limited practical value beyond producing melting point references as the enthalpy of dissolution for the melting point depressant is often significantly greater (e.g. ΔH -57.61 kJ/mol for KOH) than the enthalpy of fusion for water itself (ΔH 6.02 kJ/mol); for reference, ΔH for the dissolution of NaCl is 3.88 kJ/mol.  This results in little to no net cooling capacity at the desired temperatures and an end mixture temperature that is higher than it was to begin with. The values claimed in the table are produced by first precooling and then combining each subsequent mixture with it surrounded by a mixture of the previous temperature increment; the mixtures must be 'stacked' within one another. 

Such acid base slushes are corrosive and therefore present handling problems. Additionally, they can not be replenished easily, as the volume of the mixture increases with each addition of refrigerant; the container (be it a bath or cold finger) will eventually need emptying and refilling to prevent it from overflowing. This makes these mixtures largely unsuitable for use in synthetic applications, as there will be no cooling surface present during the emptying of the container.

See also 
 Cooling bath

References

Thermodynamics
Physical chemistry
Chemical thermodynamics